This is a list of museums in Kyrgyzstan.

Museums in Kyrgyzstan 
Burana Tower
Kyrgyz State Historical Museum
M. V. Frunze Museum
Manas Ordo
National Historical and Archaeological Museum Complex Sulayman

See also 

 List of museums

Museums
Museums
Museums
Kyrgyzstan
Kyrgyzstan